Lionel Martin (born 21 July 1974) is a retired Swiss football defender.

References

1974 births
Living people
Swiss men's footballers
Neuchâtel Xamax FCS players
AC Bellinzona players
FC Bulle players
Association football defenders
Swiss Super League players